Slavyanka is a rural locality (a khutor) in Yevstratovskoye Rural Settlement, Rossoshansky District, Voronezh Oblast, Russia. The population was 65 as of 2010.

Geography 
Slavyanka is located 21 km east of Rossosh (the district's administrative centre) by road. Yevstratovka is the nearest rural locality.

References 

Rural localities in Rossoshansky District